Optimum Publishing International is an independent international publisher, specializing in political, human and civil rights, geo-politics and espionage and intelligence books.

History 
Optimum Publishing International was originally founded as the publishing arm of the Montreal Star in the late 1960s. It continued to operate in the 1970s, even during the Star’s strike.

Post-strike, the book publisher was acquired by Michael Baxendale, who led the publishing house until his death in 2017. Dean Baxendale, the son of Michael relaunched the company in 2018.

Controversies 
Optimum has published a number of national and international authors.  Due to the subjects covered in the course of publishing, the organization has been subject to pushback.

Patrick Brown 
Optimum International Publishing was named in a suit over publishing a book by Canadian politician Patrick Brown. The publisher stood by the author based on their legal vetting of first hand witnesses and evidence that the content was indeed truthful. In a sworn deposition the person who made the accusations against Vic Fedeli confirmed her allegations and that deposition remains a matter of record in the Ontario Court. The case was quickly settled after the testimony.  The case resulted in no settlement but an apology from Brown.  The publisher’s insurer disputed its obligations for reimbursement of legal fees for the author.  The insurer lost the case in superior court and all fees were paid to Brown’s attorney’s.  In March of 2022 Brown settled his suit with CTV.  The network corrected the story that lead to his resignation while admitting no fault allowing anchor Lisa Laflamme to continue her career without further embarrassment. In the taped audio recording Lisa Leflamme is made aware that she wasn’t underage and had no idea why she was being interviewed by her.

Criticism of China 
In 2021, the publisher released two books that shared critical views of China and exposed their links to transnational organized crime and political influence operations in western democracies. Shortly afterwards Twitter suspended the publisher’s main Twitter accounts, as well at 5 affiliated accounts based on a United Front Works and MSS operation to discredit author Sam Cooper and the bestselling book’s findings. Optimum continues to make global leaders, academia, the intelligence apparatus and most importantly the public about Human Rights atrocities, malign state sponsored criminal activities and influence (graft) operations targeting democracie’s political, academic and business elite  through it’s Conference, multimedia and publishing divisions.

References 

Book publishing companies of Canada
Companies based in Toronto